Mulberry is a city in Crawford County, Arkansas, United States. It is part of the Fort Smith, Arkansas-Oklahoma Metropolitan Statistical Area.  The population was 1,655 as of the 2010 Census, an increase of % from 1,627 in 2000.



Geography
According to the 2010 Census, Mulberry is located at  (35.508517, -94.074754).

Demographics

2020 census

As of the 2020 United States census, there were 1,543 people, 718 households, and 446 families residing in the city.

2000 census
As of the 2000 United States Census, there were 1,627 people, 669 households, and 472 families residing in the city. The racial makeup of the city was 96.19% White, 0.06% Black or African American, 2.64% Native American, 0.25% Asian, and 0.86% from two or more races.  0.92% of the population were Hispanic or Latino of any race.

There were 669 households, out of which 28.1% had children under the age of 18 living with them, 56.4% were married couples living together, 9.9% had a female householder with no husband present, and 29.4% were non-families. 26.3% of all households were made up of individuals, and 15.8% had someone living alone who was 65 years of age or older.  The average household size was 2.37 and the average family size was 2.83.

In the city, the population was spread out, with 23.3% under the age of 18, 8.2% from 18 to 24, 26.9% from 25 to 44, 24.3% from 45 to 64, and 17.3% who were 65 years of age or older.  The median age was 39 years. For every 100 females, there were 96.7 males.  For every 100 females age 18 and over, there were 89.4 males.

The median income for a household in the city was $27,197, and the median income for a family was $32,321. Males had a median income of $28,281 versus $17,734 for females. The per capita income for the city was $14,204.  About 14.9% of families and 19.9% of the population were below the poverty line, including 23.7% of those under age 18 and 19.9% of those age 65 or over.

Education 
Public education for elementary and secondary students is provided by the Mulberry–Pleasant View Bi-County School District, which leads to graduation from Mulberry High School.

See also 
 List of cities in Arkansas
 Pleasant Hill, Crawford County, Arkansas, a neighborhood of Mulberry

References

External links 

 

Cities in Arkansas
Cities in Crawford County, Arkansas
Fort Smith metropolitan area